Handy Corner is a crossroads and unincorporated community in Olive Branch, in east-central DeSoto County, Mississippi, United States. It lies at the junction of Goodman and Center Hill roads.

References

Unincorporated communities in DeSoto County, Mississippi
Unincorporated communities in Mississippi